Pöllänen is a Finnish surname. Notable people with the surname include:

Herkko Pöllänen (born 1994), Finnish tennis player
Krista Pöllänen (born 1981), Finnish ten-pin bowler
Tomi Pöllänen (born 1978), Finnish ice hockey player

Finnish-language surnames